Shadluy-e Olya (also Romanized as Shādlūy-e ‘Olyā; also known as Qorban Kandī and Shādlū-ye ‘Olyā) is a village in Avajiq-e Jonubi Rural District, Dashtaki District, Chaldoran County, West Azerbaijan Province, Iran. At the 2006 census, its population was 204, in 40 families.

References 

Populated places in Chaldoran County